Sir John Killigrew (died 5 March 1584) of Arwenack, near Penryn, Cornwall, was the 2nd Governor of Pendennis Castle (1568–1584), appointed by Queen Elizabeth I, as stated on his father's brass in St Budock's Church. He was MP for Lostwithiel in 1563 and twice for the family's pocket borough of Penryn, in 1571 and 1572. 

Although appointed a commissioner to enquire into piracy, he was himself a notorious pirate and smuggler. He was described as a man "who might sometimes keep within the law, but only out of fear of punishment".

Origins
He was the eldest son and heir of John Killigrew (died 1567) of Arwenack, the first Governor of Pendennis Castle appointed by King Henry VIII, by his wife Elizabeth Trewennard, second daughter of James Trewennard of Trewennard, in the parish of St Erth, Cornwall.

Career
Together with his father, he opposed the Catholic Queen Mary I (1553–1558) and her husband, Philip II of Spain, and used his fleet of ships to keep the Protestant exiles in France abreast of political developments and to attack Spanish shipping in the Channel. In 1556, he was imprisoned by Mary with his father in the Fleet, but released after three weeks. 

Upon the succession of the Protestant Queen Elizabeth I (1558–1603), he was restored to royal favour and knighted on 25 December 1576. 

He became notorious for engaging in cattle theft, "evil usage in keeping of a castle" (presumably Pendennis) and as a Justice of the peace for abuses in arranging the quarter sessions. Having been appointed a Commissioner to inquire into piracy, he himself was heavily engaged in that activity and traded with smugglers and pirates who frequented the waters around Arwenack. He was the subject of an official investigation in 1565. 

In January 1582, both he and his wife, Mary Wolverston, were suspected of involvement in a notorious act of piracy concerning a Spanish ship which had sheltered from a storm in an anchorage opposite Arwenack. It was said that he and his wife had acted together to overpower or murder the crew and steal the cargo of cloth, before ordering the ship to be disposed of in Ireland.

Marriage and children
He married Mary Wolverston, a daughter of Philip Wolverston (often described as a "gentleman pirate") of Wolverston Hall in Suffolk, and widow of Henry Knyvett. Their children included:
John Killigrew V (c. 1557 – 1605), of Arwenack, eldest son and heir, three times MP for Penryn in 1584, 1586 and 1597, and Vice-Admiral of Cornwall and like his father and grandfather Captain of Pendennis Castle (1584–98). 
Simon Killigrew
Thomas Killigrew 
Mary Killigrew, who died unmarried
Katherine Killigrew (died 1598), youngest daughter, who was the 3rd wife of Sir Henry Billingsley (c. 1538 – 1606) Lord Mayor of London.

Death and burial

He died on 5 March 1584. He was buried in St Budock's Church, near Arwenack, where there is a mural monument to him, erected by his son, showing effigies of him and his wife facing each other kneeling in prayer. He died heavily in debt: his brother, the leading diplomat Sir Henry Killigrew, paid off some of his more pressing debts, but his son John entered on an inheritance which was already insolvent, and died a ruined man in 1605.

In fiction

In the historical novel The Grove of Eagles by Winston Graham, Sir John's formidable widow Mary Wolverston ("old Lady Killigrew") is arguably the dominant character - the protagonist's highly intimidating grandmother. In her bitter old age, she regards the Killigrew family with contempt, but acknowledges that her husband was probably "the best of a poor lot". 

Additionally, he appears in the novel The Sea Hawk by Raphael Sabatini, and in With the Knights of Malta by Douglas Valder Duff (using the pseudonym of Peter Wickloe).

References

Year of birth unknown
1584 deaths
People from Penryn, Cornwall
English pirates
 Killigrew
English MPs 1563–1567
English MPs 1571
English justices of the peace
English knights
Knights Bachelor
Members of the Parliament of England for Lostwithiel
Members of the Parliament of England for Penryn